Mark Embree is professor of computational and applied mathematics  at Virginia Tech in Blacksburg, Virginia. Until 2013, he was a professor of computational and applied mathematics at Rice University in Houston, Texas.

Mark Embree was awarded Man of the Year and Outstanding Student in the College of Arts and Sciences at Virginia Tech in 1996.  He was also a Rhodes Scholar at the University of Oxford, where he completed his doctorate.

Early life 

Mark Embree attended Thomas Jefferson High School for Science and Technology.

Research 
His main research interests are Krylov subspace methods, non-normal operators and spectral perturbation theory, Toeplitz matrices, random matrices, and damped wave operators.

Books 
Dr Mark Embree wrote a book with Lloyd N. Trefethen titled Spectra and Pseudospectra: The Behavior of Nonnormal Matrices and Operators.

See also
 Embree–Trefethen constant

External links
Dr. Embree's Virginia Tech Homepage
Dr. Embree's Rice Homepage
Dr. Embree's Mathematical Genealogy
Spectra and Pseudospectra: The Behavior of Nonnormal Matrices and Operators

References

20th-century American mathematicians
American Rhodes Scholars
Rice University faculty
Virginia Tech alumni
Year of birth missing (living people)
Living people
Place of birth missing (living people)
21st-century American mathematicians
Thomas Jefferson High School for Science and Technology alumni